The iPad is a brand of iOS and iPadOS-based tablet computers that are developed by Apple Inc. The iPad was conceived before the related iPhone but the iPhone was developed and released first. Speculation about the development, operating system, and release of the original iPad began in 2002 prior to its introduction on January 27, 2010. The iPad range consists of the original iPad lineup and the flagship products iPad Mini, iPad Air, and iPad Pro.

The iPhone's iOS operating system (OS) was initially used for the iPad but in September 2019, its OS was switched to a fork of iOS called iPadOS that has better support for the device's hardware and its user interface is customized for the tablets' larger screens. The iPad's App Store is subject to application and content approval. Many older devices are susceptible to jailbreaking, which circumvents these restrictions. The original iPad was well-received for its software and was recognized as one of the most-influential inventions of 2010.
As of the third quarter of 2021, iPad had a market share of 34.6%; beside personal use, the iPad is used in the business, education, healthcare, and technology sectors. There are two variants of iPad; one has only Wi-Fi and one has support for cellular networks. Accessories include the Apple Pencil, Smart Case, Smart Keyboard, Smart Keyboard Folio, Magic Keyboard, and several adapters.

History

Background 

Apple co-founder and CEO Steve Jobs said in a 1983 speech: "What we want to do is we want to put an incredibly great computer in a book that you can carry around with you and learn how to use in 20 minutes... and we really want to do it with a radio link in it so you don't have to hook up to anything and you're in communication with all of these larger databases and other computers".

In 1993, Apple worked on the Newton MessagePad, a tablet-like personal digital assistant (PDA). John Sculley, Apple's chief executive officer, led the development. The MessagePad was poorly received for its indecipherable handwriting recognition feature and was discontinued at the direction of Jobs, who returned to Apple in 1998 after an internal power struggle. Apple also prototyped a PowerBook Duo–based tablet computer but decided not to release it to avoid hurting MessagePad sales.

In May 2004, Apple filed a design trademark patent in Europe for a handheld computer, hypothetically referencing the iPad, beginning a new round of speculation that led to a 2003 report of Apple-affiliated manufacturer Quanta leaking Apple's orders for wireless displays. In May 2005, Apple filed US Design Patent No. D504,889 that included an illustration depicting a man touching and using a tablet device. In August 2008, Apple filed a 50-page patent application that includes an illustration of hands touching and gesturing on a tablet computer. In September 2009, Taiwan Economic News, citing "industry sources", reported the tablet computer Apple was working on would be announced in February 2010, although the announcement was made in that year's January.

The iPad's concept predates that of the iPhone, although the iPhone was developed and released before the iPad. In 1991, Apple's chief design officer Jonathan Ive devised an industrial design of a stylus-based tablet, the Macintosh Folio, which led to the development of a larger tablet prototype project codenamed K48 that Apple began in 2004. Ive sought to develop the tablet first but came to an agreement with Jobs the iPhone was more important and should be prioritized.

iPad 

The first generation of iPad was announced on January 27, 2010, and pre-ordering began on March 12. A Wi-Fi-capable version was released in the United States on April 3 and a 3G-capable version was released on April 30. Apple released iPad models internationally on May 28, July 23, and September 17. The first iPad has a 1 GHz Apple A4 central processing unit (CPU) with 256 megabytes (MB) of random access memory (RAM) and a PowerVR SGX535 graphics processing unit (GPU). It has four buttons; a home button that directs the user to its homepage, a wake-and-sleep button, and two volume-control buttons. Its multi-touch-based display has a resolution of 1,024 by 768 pixels.

The second generation of iPad was announced on March 2, 2011, and released on March 11. It is 33% thinner and 15% lighter than its predecessor, and uses a dual-core Apple A5 chip consisting of a twice-as-fast CPU and a nine-times-faster GPU. It has one camera each on the front and the back, both of which support Apple's video-telephony service, FaceTime. Apple slimmed the iPad by eliminating the display's stamped-sheet-metal frame, using thinner glass for the screen overlay, and eliminating some space between the display and battery.

The third generation of iPad was announced on March 7, 2012, and released on March 16. It uses a dual-core Apple A5X chip embedded with quad-core graphics. Its Retina Display is 2,048 by 1,536 pixels and its pixels are 50% denser than those of standard displays. Unlike the iPhone and iPod Touch's built-in applications, which work in portrait, landscape-left and landscape-right orientations, the iPad's built-in applications support the upside-down orientation of the device. Consequently, the device has no "native" orientation; only the relative position of the home button changes.

The fourth generation of iPad was announced on October 23, 2012, and released on November 2. It has an Apple A6X chip, improved LTE and WiFi connectivity, a five-megapixel, rear-facing camera that is capable of recording 1080p videos, and a 720p front-facing FaceTime HD camera. Its display has a resolution of 2,048 by 1,536 pixels.

The fifth generation of iPad was announced on March 21, 2017, and released on March 24. It uses an Apple A9 chip with an accompanying M9 motion coprocessor, and its cameras can capture low-light and HD-quality shots. Despite using the same Apple A9 and M9 processors as the 2015 iPhone 6S, it lacks support of the always-on "Hey Siri" voice recognition, a feature advertised as being made possible by low-power processing in those chips.

The sixth generation of iPad was announced and released on March 27, 2018. It uses a dual-core Apple A10 Fusion chip and feature a 1080p and 30fps rear mounted 8-megapixel iSight camera, and a 720p Facetime HD camera. It was the first non-Pro iPad to support the Apple Pencil. It also had faster FaceTime HD, LTE connectivity, Touch ID, and multitask functionalities.

The seventh generation of iPad was announced on September 10, 2019, and released on September 25. It uses a 64-bit Apple A10 Fusion chip, with a 4-core CPU and 6-core GPU. Its slightly larger 10.2" Retina Display has a resolution of 2,160 × 1,620 (3.5 million pixels). It added support for the Smart Keyboard accessory.

The eighth generation of iPad was announced on September 15, 2020, and released on September 18. It uses an Apple A12 Bionic chip, which has a 40 percent faster 6-core CPU and a 2-times faster 4-core GPU than its predecessor. The Apple A12 also included an embedded Neural Engine, and is capable of processing 5 trillion operations per second. Its Retina Display had a resolution of 1668 by 2388 pixels.

The ninth generation of iPad was announced and released on September 14, 2021. It uses an Apple A13 Bionic chip, which has a 20% faster CPU and GPU and an embedded, artificial intelligence–immersed Neural Engine. Its 12-megapixel ultra wide front camera adds support for Apple's "Center Stage Mode" technology, which locates people in the frame and tracks the camera view to keep them centered. Its Retina Display added support for the True Tone technology, which automatically adjusts the screen color temperature according to the ambient lighting.

The 10th-generation iPad was announced on October 18, 2022, with pre-orders starting immediately and availability set for October 26. It uses the Apple A14 Bionic chip, has a larger 10.9-inch screen, and replaces the Lightning connector with USB-C. Unlike all previous models in the iPad range, as well as the sixth-generation iPad Pro announced the same day, this model's front-facing camera is placed along the device's long edge, making it more suitable for video calling applications. Despite having a USB-C connector, it is not compatible with the second-generation Apple Pencil that can be used with all other USB-C iPads, instead using the first-generation Pencil with a USB-C-to-Lightning adapter, which will be included with new Pencil purchases. While lacking the Smart Connector of the Pro and Air lines, it is compatible with a new Magic Keyboard Folio announced alongside the device. This model did not immediately replace the 9th-generation iPad; Apple will continue to sell the older model at the same price, while the price for the newer 10th generation model was increased.

iPad Mini 

The first generation of the flagship, smaller iPad Mini was announced on October 23, 2012, and released on November 2. It uses a dual-core Apple A5 chip, and has hardware resembling that of the second generation of iPad. It has a FaceTime HD camera, a 5-megapixel iSight camera, an ultrafast wireless LTE range, and a 802.11a/b/g/n standard Wifi connectivity. It targets the emerging sector of mini tablets, such as Kindle Fire and Nexus 7.

The second generation of iPad Mini was announced on October 22, 2013, and released on November 12. Its hardware resembles that of the first generation of iPad Air. (below)

The third generation of iPad Mini was announced on October 16, 2014, and released on October 22. It uses an Apple A7 chip with an embedded M7 motion coprocessor, and its 7.9-inch Retina screen display has a resolution of 2048 by 1536 pixels. It includes a 1080p HD camera, a FaceTime HD camera, and a 5-megapixel iSight camera.

The fourth generation of iPad Mini was announced and released on September 9, 2015. It uses a dual-core Apple A8 chip with an embedded Apple M8 motion coprocessor. Its headphone jack was re-positioned with the removal of a mute switch.

The fifth generation of iPad Mini was announced and released on March 18, 2019. It uses an Apple A12 Bionic chip, with a 3-times faster CPU and a 9-times faster GPU than its predecessor. It features a Truetone-based Retina screen display with 25% wider Color and higher pixel density.

The sixth generation of iPad Mini was announced and released on September 24, 2021. It uses an Apple A15 Bionic chip, with a 40% faster 6-core CPU and 80% faster 5-core GPU. Its 16-core Neural Engine and AI accelerators within the CPU delivers a 2x boost of AI performance. Its 12-megapixel Ultra Wide front camera featured Apple's "Center Stage Mode" technology, while its 12-megapixel back camera had larger apertures, True Tone flash, and Smart HDR automatic shadow and highlight recovery. It includes a USB-C port, capable of transferring up to 5 gigabits per second of data; improved landscape stereo speakers; and a brighter Liquid Retina Display.

iPad Air 

The first generation of iPad Air was announced on October 22, 2013, and released on November 1. It used an Apple A7 chip with an embedded Apple M7 Motion coprocessor; the chip included over a billion transistors and comprised a 2x faster CPU and GPU. It debuted the 80211n-based MINO technology used in its Wi-Fi connectivity, and it had an extended range of LTE telecommunication. It also came with a Retina Display.

The second generation of iPad Air was announced on October 16, 2014, and released on October 22. It used an Apple A8X chip with a 2.5x faster CPU. Its 8MP iSight Camera had 1.12-micron pixels and a f/2.4 aperture, while its FaceTime Camera had f/2.2 aperture and 81% light capacity. Its display had a revised 56% lower reflective rate. It also had an extended range of LTE telecommunication service.

The third generation of iPad Air was announced on March 18, 2019, and released on March 25. It used an Apple A12 Bionic with an embedded Neural Engine, 6-core CPU and 4-core GPU. Its 866 Mbit/s WiFi connectivity are LTE-based, and it is equipped with a 1080p HD video camera.

The fourth generation of iPad Air was announced on September 15, 2020, and released on October 23. It used an Apple A14 Bionic chip, which comprised 11.9 billion transistors, a 40% faster 6-core CPU, a 30% faster 4-core GPU, and an embedded Neural Engine that can process 11 trillion operations per second. Its 10.9-inch Liquid Retina Screen display has a resolution of 2360 by 1640 pixels (3.8 million pixels). Its front 7-megapixel Facetime Camera is of 1080p and 60 fps, while its 12-megapixel webcam featured 8 aperture, 4K, 60fps, and video stabilization.

The fifth generation of iPad Air was announced on March 8, 2022, and released on March 18.  It used an Apple M1 chip.

iPad Pro 

The first generation of the high-end and professional flagship iPad Pro was announced on September 9, 2015, and released on November 11, (12.9-inch version) and March 31 (9.7-inch).It used an Apple A9X chip, with a 2x higher memory bandwidth and a 1.8x faster CPU than its predecessor. It audio system consisted of 4 audio ports and its volume were more 3x more efficient than the second generation of iPad Air, and its 12-inch screen display had a resolution of 2732 by 2043 pixels.

The second generation of iPad Pro was announced on June 5, 2017, and was released on June 13. It used an Apple A10X chip, with a 6-core CPU and 12-core GPU. It can process 120 Hz HDR quality medias, 2x higher quality than its predecessor. Its ultra-low reflective Retina Display featured a 50% optimized True Tone technology (which automatically adjust the screen accordingly to its ambient color and brightness rates), Wide Color Integration, and up to 500 nit brightness rates. It also had a 12-megapixel rear-facing camera and a 7-megapixel front-facing camera.

The third generation of iPad Pro was announced on October 30, 2018, and released on November 7, and it is the first iPad to support 1TB of storage. It used a 7 nm Apple A12X Bionic chip, which comprised 11 billion transistors, an 8-core CPU, 7-core GPU and an embedded Neural Engine capable of processing 5 trillion operations per second. Apple replaced the Touch ID fingerprint recognition biometric authentication with its facial counterpart, Face ID.

The fourth generation of iPad Pro was announced and released on March 18, 2020. It used an Apple A12Z chip, with an 8-core CPU and 8-core GPU. Its Gibt-class Wi-Fi connectivity is 60% faster than that of its predecessor. It introduced a 10-megapixel ultra-wide camera, alongside its 12-megapixel wide camera, capable of capturing 4k video. These cameras allow it to capture medias with wider visibility, and its audio system automatically detects and attracts any orientation nearby.

The fifth generation of iPad Pro was announced on April 20, 2021, and released on May 21. It used an innovative desktop-class Apple M1 chip, which comprised a 40% faster 8-core CPU, a 4x faster 8-core GPU, and a 4x higher bandwidth. It featured a ƒ/1.8 aperture 12-megapixel wide-angle pro camera (captures high quality shots) and a ƒ/2.4 aperture 10-megapixel ultrawide camera (captures enhanced Augmented Reality interactive experience). It debuted Apple's "Center Stage mode" technology, which pinpoints the positions of the users and automatically tracks the camera view accordingly to perspectivally centralize them. The 12.9-inch version had a mini LED-based Liquid Retina XDR display, compared to the 11-inch model's lesser IPS LCD-based Liquid Retina display.

The sixth generation of iPad Pro was announced on October 18th, 2022, and released on October 26th. It used an Apple M2 chip, with an 8-core CPU and 10-core GPU.

Cellular connectivity 
The iPad comes in two variants: Wi-Fi only and Wi-Fi with cellular support. Unlike the iPhone, the cellular variant did not support voice calls and text messages, but only data connectivity; it also had an additional micro-SIM circuit slot attached on the side. The 3G-based iPad is compatible with any GSM carrier, unlike the iPhone which is usually sold locked' to specific carriers. For the first generation of iPad, cellular access from T-Mobile was limited to slower EDGE cellular speeds because T-Mobile's network at the time used different frequencies.

The second generation of iPad introduced a third tier of CDMA support from Verizon, which is available separately from the AT&T-based version. The fifth generation of iPad used a nano-SIM circuit slot, while its predecessors used micro-SIM. The iPads used two frequency bands; both support the same quad-band GSM and quad-band UMTS frequencies. One supports LTE bands 4 and 17 (principally intended for use on the U.S. AT&T network), and the other supports LTE bands 1, 3, 5, 13, 25 and CDMA EV-DO Rev. A and Rev. B.

Apple extended the range of cellular compatibilities worldwide with the release of the fifth generation of iPad and the second generation of iPad Mini, worldwide and all major carriers across North America. The iPad Air and iPad Mini come in two cellular sub-variants, all of which featured nano-SIMs, quad-band GSM, penta-band UMTS, and dual-band CDMA EV-DO Rev. A and B. One supports LTE bands 1, 2, 3, 4, 5, 7, 8, 13, 17, 18, 19, 20, 25 and 26, and the other supports LTE bands 1, 2, 3, 5, 7, 8, 18, 19, 20 and TD-LTE bands 38, 39 and 40.

Accessories 

Apple offers many iPad accessories, ranging from keyboards, styluses, cases, to adapters; a 10 W power adapter is bundled with the device. In addition to a camera connection kit which consists of two adapters for the iPad's dock connector, one of USB Type A and one of SD card reader; these adapters can transfer photographs and videos and connect USB audio card and MIDI keyboard.

Apple's list of accessories included the Apple Pencil ― a wireless stylus pen, Smart Cover ― a magnetic screen protector that align to the face of an iPad with three folds that is convertible into a stand, Smart Case ― a fine case combining the functions of a Smart Cover and a back-protection case, Smart Keyboard Folio ― an externally-paired keyboard and a combination of a Smart Case and its predecessor, a Smart Keyboard, Magic Keyboard, ― an externally-paired keyboard similar to the formers but with integrated trackpads which the Smart Keyboard Folio and Smart Keyboard lack.

Software 

Since its introduction in 2010, the iPad runs on the iPhone's iOS mobile operating system, but it was later replaced with an optimized derivation, iPadOS, in September 2019. It shares the former's development environment and many of its applications and features. The iPad is compatible with nearly every iPhone application through iOS, and developers can optimize these applications to take full advantage of the iPad's software. They used iOS SDK, a software development kit.

The iOS user interface is based upon direct manipulation, using multi-touch gestures such as swipe, tap, pinch, and reverse pinch. Interface control elements include sliders, switches, and buttons. Internal accelerometers are used by some applications to respond to shaking the device (one common result is the undo command) or rotating it in three dimensions (one common result is switching between portrait and landscape mode). Various accessibility described in § Accessibility functions enable users with vision and hearing disabilities to properly use iOS.

iOS devices boot to the homescreen, the primary navigation and information "hub" on iOS devices, analogous to the desktop found on personal computers. iOS homescreens are typically made up of app icons and widgets; app icons launch the associated app, whereas widgets display live, auto-updating content, such as a weather forecast, the user's email inbox, or a news ticker directly on the homescreen.
Along the top of the screen is a status bar, showing information about the device and its connectivity. The status bar itself contains two elements, the Control Center and the Notification Center.

iOS' Control Center can be "pulled" down from the top right of the notch, giving access to various toggles to manage the device more quickly without having to open the Settings. It is possible to manage brightness, volume, wireless connections, music player, etc. A homescreen may be made up of several pages, between which the user can swipe back and forth, one of the ways to do this is to hold down on the "dots" shown on each page and swipe left or right. To the right of the last page, the App Library lists and categorizes apps installed on the device. Apps within each category are arranged based on the frequency of their usage. In addition to a category for suggested apps, a "recent" category lists apps recently installed alongside App Clips recently accessed. Users can search for the app they want or browse them in alphabetical order.

iOS' multitasking API included Background audio – application continues to run in the background as long as it is playing audio or video content, voice over IP – application is suspended when a phone call is not in progress, Push notification, Local notifications – application schedules local notifications to be delivered at a predetermined time, Task completion – application asks the system for extra time to complete a given task, Fast app switching – application does not execute any code and may be removed from memory at any time, Newsstand – applications can download content in the background to be ready for the uses, External Accessory – application communicates with an external accessory and shares data at regular intervals, Bluetooth Accessory – application communicates with a Bluetooth accessory and shares data at regular intervals, and Background application update.

iPadOS features a multitasking system developed with more capabilities compared to iOS, with features like Slide Over and Split View that make it possible to use multiple different applications simultaneously. Double-clicking the Home Button or swiping up from the bottom of the screen and pausing will display all currently active spaces. Each space can feature a single app, or a Split View featuring two apps. The user can also swipe left or right on the Home Indicator to go between spaces at any time, or swipe left/right with four fingers.

In iPadOS, while using an app, swiping up slightly from the bottom edge of the screen will summon the Dock, where apps stored within can be dragged to different areas of the current space to be opened in either Split View or Slide Over. Dragging an app to the left or right edge of the screen will create a Split View, which will allow both apps to be used side by side. The size of the two apps in Split View can be adjusted by dragging a pill-shaped icon in the center of the vertical divider and dragging the divider all the way to one side of the screen closes the respective app. If the user drags an app from the dock over the current app, it will create a floating window called Slide Over which can be dragged to either the left or right side of the screen. A Slide Over window can be hidden by swiping it off the right side of the screen, and swiping left from the right edge of the screen will restore it. Slide Over apps can also be cycled between by swiping left or right on the Home Indicator in the Slide Over window and pulling up on it will open an app switcher for Slide Over windows. A pill-shaped icon at the top of apps in Split View or Slide Over allows them to be switched in an out of Split View and Slide Over.

Model comparison

Operating system support

Restrictions

Digital rights management 

The iPad does not employ digital rights management (DRM), but the OS prevents users from copying or transferring certain content outside of Apple's platform without authorization, such as TV shows, movies, and apps. Also, the iPad's development model requires anyone creating an app for the iPad to sign a non-disclosure agreement and pay for a developer subscription. Critics argue Apple's centralized app approval process and control of the platform itself could stifle software innovation. Of particular concern to digital rights advocates is Apple's ability to remotely disable or delete apps on any iPad at any time.

Digital rights advocates, including the Free Software Foundation, Electronic Frontier Foundation, and computer engineer and activist Brewster Kahle, have criticized the iPad for its digital rights restrictions. In April 2010, Paul Sweeting, an analyst with GigaOM, was quoted by NPR as saying, "With the iPad, you have the anti-Internet in your hands. ... It offers [the major media companies] the opportunity to essentially re-create the old business model, wherein they are pushing content to you on their terms rather than you going out and finding content, or a search engine discovering content for you." But Sweeting also thought that the limitations imposed by Apple impart the feeling of a safe neighborhood, saying, "Apple is offering you a gated community where there's a guard at the gate, and there's probably maid service, too." Laura Sydell, the article's author, concludes, "As more consumers have fears about security on the Internet, viruses, and malware, they may be happy to opt for Apple's gated community." The Russian government has switched from iPads to Android devices over security concerns.

Jailbreaking 

Like other iOS devices, the iPad can be "jailbroken", depending on which version of iOS or iPadOS it is running, thus allowing applications and programs that are not authorized by Apple to run on the device. Once it is jailbroken, users are able to download many applications previously unavailable through the App Store via unofficial installers such as Cydia, as well as illegally pirated applications. Apple claims jailbreaking "can" void the factory warranty on the device in the United States even though jailbreaking is legal. The iPad, released in April 2010, was first jailbroken in May 2010 with the Spirit jailbreak for iOS version 3.1.2. The iPad can be jailbroken on iOS versions 4.3 through 4.3.3 with the web-based tool JailbreakMe 3.0 (released in July 2011), and on iOS versions including 5.0 and 5.0.1 using redsn0w Absinthe 2.0 was released on May 25, 2012, as the first jailbreak method for all iOS 5.1.1 devices except the 32 nm version of the iPad 2.

Censorship 
Apple's App Store, which provides iPhone and iPad applications, imposes censorship of content, which has become an issue for book publishers and magazines seeking to use the platform. The Guardian newspaper described the role of Apple as analogous to that of British magazine distributor WH Smith, which for many years imposed content restrictions.

Due to the exclusion of pornography from the App Store, YouPorn and others changed their video format from Flash to H.264 and HTML5 specifically for the iPad. In an e-mail exchange with Ryan Tate from Valleywag, Steve Jobs claimed that the iPad offers "freedom from porn", leading to many upset replies including Adbustings in Berlin by artist Johannes P. Osterhoff and in San Francisco during WWDC10.

Original reception 
Media reaction to the original iPad was mixed. The media noted the positive response from fans of the device, with thousands of people queued on the first day of sale in a number of these countries.

The iPad was quickly successful and sold in large numbers after its 2010 launch. Analysts have noted that while Apple's previous iPod and iPhone launches took some time till taking off, the iPad was commercially popular from the beginning and faced little market competition during its first year.

Reaction to the announcement 
Media reaction to the announcement of the original iPad was mixed. Walter Mossberg wrote, "It's about the software, stupid", meaning hardware features and build are less important to the iPad's success than software and user interface, his first impressions of which were largely positive. Mossberg also called the price "modest" for a device of its capabilities, and praised the ten-hour battery life. Others, including PC Advisor and the Sydney Morning Herald, wrote that the iPad would also compete with proliferating netbooks, most of which use Microsoft Windows. The base model's $499 price was lower than pre-release estimates by the tech press, Wall Street analysts, and Apple's competitors, all of whom were expecting a much higher entry price point.

CNET also criticized the iPad for its apparent lack of wireless sync which other portable devices such as Microsoft's Zune have had for a number of years. The built-in iTunes app is able to download from the Internet as well.

Critical response 
Reviews of the original iPad have been generally favorable. Walt Mossberg then, of The Wall Street Journal called it a "pretty close" laptop killer. David Pogue of The New York Times wrote a "dual" review, one part for technology-minded people, and the other part for non-technology-minded people. In the former section, he notes that a laptop offers more features for a cheaper price than the iPad. In his review for the latter audience, however, he claims that if his readers like the concept of the device and can understand what its intended uses are, then they will enjoy using the device. PC Magazine'''s Tim Gideon wrote, "you have yourself a winner" that "will undoubtedly be a driving force in shaping the emerging tablet landscape." Michael Arrington of TechCrunch said, "the iPad beats even my most optimistic expectations. This is a new category of device. But it also will replace laptops for many people." PC World criticized the iPad's file sharing and printing abilities, and Ars Technica said sharing files with a computer is "one of our least favorite parts of the iPad experience."

The media also praised the quantity of applications, as well as the bookstore and other media applications. In contrast they criticized the iPad for being a closed system and mentioned that the iPad faces competition from Android-based tablets, that outsold iPads in 2013, surpassing iPads in the second quarter of 2013, and have overtaken iPad's installed base, and has lost majority of web browsing to Android, by StatCounter estimates, in South America, Africa, most of Asia many large countries there and in Eastern Europe. The Independent criticized the iPad for not being as readable in bright light as paper but praised it for being able to store large quantities of books. After its UK release, The Daily Telegraph said the iPad's lack of Adobe Flash support was "annoying."

 Recognition 
The original iPad was selected by Time magazine as one of the 50 Best Inventions of the Year 2010, while Popular Science chose it as the top gadget behind the overall "Best of What's New 2010" winner Groasis Waterboxx.

 Usage 
 Market share 

The iPad had a relatively stable global market share. It received a significant drop in the third quarter of 2012 but gradually recovered, although not as abundant as before. As of the third quarter of 2021, it had a market share of 34.6%.

 Business 

While the iPad is mostly used by consumers, it also has been taken up by business users. Within 90 days of its release, the iPad managed to penetrate 50% of Fortune 100 companies. Some companies are adopting iPads in their business offices by distributing or making available iPads to employees. Examples of uses in the workplace include attorneys responding to clients, medical professionals accessing health records during patient exams, and managers approving employee requests.

A survey by Frost & Sullivan shows that iPad usage in office workplaces is linked to the goals of increased employee productivity, reduced paperwork, and increased revenue. The research firm estimates that "The mobile-office application market in North America may reach $6.85 billion in 2015, up from an estimated $1.76 billion [in 2010]."

Since March 2011, the US Federal Aviation Administration (FAA) has approved the iPad for in-cockpit use to cut down on the paper consumption in several airlines. It hopes to have fewer back and muscle injuries. More than a dozen airlines have followed suit, including United, which has distributed  iPads to cockpits. Also, many airlines now offer their inflight magazine as a downloadable application for the iPad.

 Education and healthcare 
The iPad has several uses in the classroom, and has been praised as a valuable tool for homeschooling and distance education. Soon after the iPad was released, it was reported that 81% of the top book apps were for children. The iPad has also been called a revolutionary tool to help children with autism learn how to communicate and socialize more easily.

In the healthcare field, iPads and iPhones have been used to help hospitals manage their supply chain. For example, Novation, a healthcare contracting services company, developed VHA PriceLynx (based on the mobile application platform of business intelligence software vendor MicroStrategy), a business intelligence app to help health care organizations manage its purchasing procedures more efficiently and save money for hospitals. Guillermo Ramas of Novation states, "Doctors won't walk around a hospital with a laptop. With an iPad it's perfect to walk around the hospital with as long as they have the information they need."

In 2013, Gianna Chien (aged 14) presented to more than 8,000 doctors at the Heart Rhythm Society meeting that the Apple iPad 2 can, in some cases, interfere with life-saving heart devices (pacemakers) because of the magnets inside. A study in 2014 found that the iPad 2 could cause electromagnetic interference (EMI) in implantable cardioverter defibrillators.

 Consumer usage 
In the United States, fans attending Super Bowl XLV, the first Super Bowl since the iPad was released, could use an official National Football League (NFL) app to navigate Cowboys Stadium. In 2011, the Tampa Bay Buccaneers became the first NFL club to discontinue the use of paper copies of playbooks, and instead distributed all players their playbook and videos in electronic format via an iPad 2.

The iPad is able to support many music creation applications in addition to the iTunes music playback software. These include sound samplers, guitar and voice effects processors, sequencers for synthesized sounds and sampled loops, virtual synthesizers and drum machines, theremin-style and other touch responsive instruments, drum pads and many more. Gorillaz's 2010 album, The Fall'', was created almost exclusively using the iPad by Damon Albarn while on tour with the band. The music video for Luna Sea's 2012 single, "Rouge", was filmed entirely on an iPad.

Timeline

See also 
 List of Apple Inc. media events
 Comparison of e-readers
 Comparison of tablet computers
 Microsoft Surface
 Pen computing

Notes

References

External links 

 

 
Apple Inc. hardware
Articles which contain graphical timelines
Computer-related introductions in 2010
Foxconn
IOS
Products introduced in 2010
Tablet computers
Touchscreen portable media players